Ted Knight (1923-1986) was an American actor.

Ted Knight is also the name of:

 Starman (Ted Knight), fictional character
 Ted Knight (politician) (1933–2020), left-wing British politician who led Lambeth council in London

See also
Edward Knight (disambiguation)